is a Japanese television and radio broadcaster in Okayama and Kagawa. The abbreviation, RSK originates in the former name in Japanese (Radio San'yō Kabushikigaisha, ラジオ山陽株式会社).  It is affiliated with Japan Radio Network (JRN), National Radio Network (NRN), and Japan News Network (JNN).

Offices

The Headquarters: 1-3, Marunouchi Nichome, Kita-ku, Okayama-shi, Japan
Shikoku Branch Office (RSK Olive Studio): Tomei Building, 3-1, Furujinmachi, Takamatsu-shi, Japan

Stations

Radio
RSK Radio 1494 kHz; 91.4 MHz FM
Stereo
Okayama JOYR 10 kW
Takahashi 1 kW
Monoral
Tsuyama 1 kW
Niimi 1 kW
Ochiai (Maniwa) 1 kW
Kasaoka 100 W
Bizen 1 kW

TV

Analog
RSK Okayama Television
JOYR-TV
Okayama Prefecture
Okayama - Channel 11, 10 kW
Kasaoka - Channel 6, 100 W
Niimi and Kuse (Maniwa) - Channel 6, 10 W
Mimasaka - Channel 6, 0.1 W
Tsuyama - Channel 7, 75 W
Takahashi and Kojima (Kurashiki) - Channel 7, 10 W
Hiruzen (Maniwa) - Channel 8, 10 W
Wake and Okutsu - Channel 12, 10 W
Soja - Channel 38, 10 W
Ibara and Bizen - Channel 61, 3 W
Mizushima (Kurashiki) - Channel 62, 10 W
Kagawa Prefecture
Takamatsu - Channel 29, 5 kW
Nishi-Sanuki - Channel 48, 3 kW
Shodoshima - Channel 49, 300 W
Shirotori (Higashikagawa) - Channel 48, 10 W
Sakaide-nishi - Channel 14, 10 W
Sakaide-higashi - Channel 22, 10 W
Kokubunji (Takamatsu) - Channel 59, 3 W
Shido (Sanuki) - Channel 62, 10 W
Ayakami (Ayagawa) - Channel 58, 3 W
Nio (Mitoyo) - Channel 56, 3 W
Tonosho - Channel 49, 10 W
Takuma (Mitoyo) - Channel 62, 1 W
Shodoshima-Ikeda - Channel 62, 3 W

Digital
RSK Okayama Digital Television
JOYR-DTV
ID: 6
Okayama - Channel 21, 2 kW
Takamatsu - Channel 21, 500 W
Nishi-Sanuki - Channel 21, 100 W

Supplement
Though the number of employees is a few, this broadcasting station has the first NETA in the whole country, and is putting in power to NETA of national advance.
It applied for license of the first FM broadcast in commercial broadcasting at the time of the end of the 1950s. (It became license withdrawal 1970)
The local evening news program "the San-yo TV evening news" in the evening was started on RSK television in 1971. (the first in the measure of composing a local news in the evening, and the whole country)
1980, according to the inside of area, the frequency of RSK radio is unified into 1494 kHz, and will become the same frequency broadcast. (the first in the example of the same frequency broadcast in area of a radio station, and the whole country)
The Okayama office and the Takahashi office of RSK radio changed to a stereophonic broadcast from monophonic broadcast in October, 1992 (the first stereophonic broadcast in a relay station of a radio station, the key station and several relay stations] in the whole country)
Since the affiliation network of RSK radio was only JRN till the autumn of 1997, the network of NRN was the form which the RNC radio (Nishinippon Broadcasting Corporation) of on-the-opposite-shore Kagawa covers.
However, the judgment considered to be disadvantageous for business as being related with this was struck by the organization after 1:00 at midnight on a weekday and Saturday of those days. Therefore, in the autumn of 1997, the network of the JRN program of the midnight of a weekday was closed and frame movement was carried out on Sunday etc. for broadcast of the all genre program of the midnight on Saturday. And "all night NIPPON" resulted in the broadcast start of the 35th game.
RSK radio was broadcasting slightly some programs of JFN(s), such as "Masaharu Fukuyama's SUZUKI Talking FM", until FM Okayama of JFN affiliation was opened in April, 1999.

Program

Radio
Ohayou Network
Dokidoki!! Radio Town
Evening Network
Okayama Night Stadium

TV
Dramatic RSK The TV program is a rebroadcasta repeat of drama
Evening DONDON!! (from Aplil 2005 to March 2011)
RSK Evening 5 o'clock (from Aplil 2011 to present)
Sanyo TV Evening News (from September 1971 to present)
Sanyo TV News (every from Thursday to Sunday)
VOICE21
Pururun

Item
Sanyo News Paper

External links
RSK HomePage

Japan News Network
Television stations in Japan
Radio in Japan
Radio stations established in 1953
Television channels and stations established in 1958
Mass media in Okayama
1953 establishments in Japan